American Rust is an American crime drama television series created by Dan Futterman based on the novel of the same name by Philipp Meyer. The series premiered on September 12, 2021, on Showtime. In January 2022, the series was canceled after one season by Showtime. In June 2022, the series was revived for a second season by Amazon Freevee.

Premise 
Set in a small Rust Belt town in Pennsylvania, chief of police Del Harris takes on an investigation when the son of the woman he loves is accused of murder.

Production 
In November 2017, a television adaptation of American Rust was ordered to series by USA Network. The pilot episode was written by Brian McGreevy, Lee Shipman, and Philipp Meyer, and to be directed by David Gordon Green. The series was scrapped on January 25, 2018, after having trouble finding a leading actor for the show.

In July 2019, the adaptation was recommissioned by Showtime, to be written by Dan Futterman and starring Jeff Daniels as Harris; they both also serve as executive producers. In March 2020, Maura Tierney, Bill Camp, David Alvarez, Alex Neustaedter and Julia Mayorga were cast as series regulars. In March 2021, Mark Pellegrino joined the cast in a series regular role, while Dallas Roberts, Clea Lewis and Nicole Chanel Williams were cast in recurring roles.

The series was filmed in and around Pittsburgh. On January 25, 2022, Showtime canceled the series after one season. On June 9, 2022, Amazon Freevee picked the series for a second season.

Cast

Main 
 Jeff Daniels as Chief Del Harris
 Maura Tierney as Grace Poe
 David Alvarez as Isaac English
 Bill Camp as Henry English
 Julia Mayorga as Lee English
 Alex Neustaedter as Billy Poe
 Mark Pellegrino as Virgil Poe
 Rob Yang as Deputy Steve Park

Recurring 
 Dallas Roberts as Jackson Berg
 Clea Lewis as Jillian
 Nicole Chanel Williams as JoJo
 Federico Rodriguez as Alejandro

Episodes

Reception 

American Rust has received mixed reviews from critics. On Rotten Tomatoes, the series holds an approval rating of 33% based on 21 critic reviews, with an average rating of 3.8/10. The website's critics consensus reads, "American Rusts tale of America lost is a worthy one, but despite an A-list cast it simply does not have the narrative clarity or heft necessary to do its subject matter justice." On Metacritic, the series has a score of 47 out of 100 based on 18 reviews, indicating "mixed or average reviews".

Based on three episodes for review, Zack Handlen of The A.V. Club gave it a "C" grade, writing "There's a lot not to like about Rust, a dreary, well-acted, badly written chunk of misery porn" and that "the dialogue is all flatly expository". Handlen concluded with, "American Rust likely has a story worth telling, and a setting worth exploring, but this version fails to make much of a case for either."

References

External links
 
 

2021 American television series debuts
2020s American crime drama television series
American television series revived after cancellation
English-language television shows
Showtime (TV network) original programming
Television shows based on American novels
Television shows set in Pennsylvania
Television shows filmed in Pittsburgh
Television series by Boat Rocker Media